Club Atlético Bella Vista, usually known simply as Bella Vista is a Uruguayan football club based in Montevideo. The club plays its home games at Estadio José Nasazzi, which can hold 10,000 spectators.

History
Club Atlético Bella Vista was founded on 4 October 1920.

In 1981, the club competed in the Copa Libertadores. The club played in the same group as Peñarol, of Uruguay, and Estudiantes de Mérida and Portuguesa FC, of Venezuela. The club was eliminated in the first stage of the competition. In 1985, the club competed in the Copa Libertadores again. Bella Vista was in the same group of Peñarol, and two Chilean clubs, Colo-Colo and Magallanes, but were again eliminated at the first stage.

In 1990, Bella Vista won the Uruguayan league, and gained the right to enter the following year's Copa Libertadores. In the following year, in 1991, the club competed in the Copa Libertadores, and was in the same group as Nacional, of Uruguay, and Flamengo and Corinthians, of Brazil. The club finished in the last place of the group. In the 1993 Copa Libertadores, Bella Vista was in the same group as Nacional, of Uruguay, and El Nacional and Barcelona, of Ecuador. After a poor campaign, the club was again eliminated in the first stage. In 1999, the club, after an absence of six years, returned to Copa Libertadores. Bella Vista was in a group containing Nacional, of Uruguay, Estudiantes de Mérida, of Venezuela, and Monterrey, of Mexico. The club finished in third in the first stage, and qualified to the second stage, where they defeated Universidad Católica, of Chile. However, in the quarterfinals, Bella Vista was eliminated by Deportivo Cali, of Colombia. It was the club's best campaign ever in the Copa Libertadores.

In 2000, Bella Vista competed again in the Copa Libertadores, and was grouped alongside Bolivians Bolívar, Atlético Mineiro, of Brazil, and Cobreloa, of Chile. The club was eliminated in the first stage of the competition.

In 2011, the club competed in the Copa Sudamericana in which they were eliminated on the First Round by Universidad Católica

Titles
Primera División: 1
 1990

Segunda División B Nacional: 1
 2018

Segunda División: 5
 1949, 1968, 1976, 1997, 2005

Tercera División: 2
 1922, 1959

Performance in CONMEBOL competitions
Copa Libertadores: 6 appearances
1981: First Round
1985: First Round
1991: First Round
1993: First Round
1999: Quarter-Finals
2000: First Round

Copa Sudamericana: 1 appearances
2011: First Round

Current squad

Jersey origin controversy
The Bella Vista jersey represents the Vatican flag, half yellow and half white. This is why the club is nicknamed the "papales", the ones who follow the papal, el papado, the Vatican authority.

Some versions say the origin can be different. Due to the divided fanaticism between Peñarol and Nacional of the club's former authorities, they decided the jersey to have the predominant colors of the two Uruguayan big clubs. Note that this is exactly what Arsenal of Sarandí from Argentina did when designing its jersey, light blue and red, due to the authorities of the club being Independiente and Racing of Avellaneda supporters.

Managers

 Voltaire García
 Manuel Keosseian
 Henry López Báez
 Hugo Bagnulo (1971)
 Juan Hohberg
 Washington Etchamendi (1973–75)
 Sergio Markarián (1976–79)
 Óscar Tabárez (1980–83)
 Jorge González (Jan 1995 – Dec 95)
 Julio César Ribas (Jan 1997 – Dec 98)
 Sergio Batista (Jan 2000 – Oct 00)
  Martín Lasarte (2000–01)
 Ildo Maneiro (2006–08)
 Gustavo Matosas (2008–09)
 Pablo Alonso (July 2009–??)
 Diego Alonso (Sept 2011 – June 12)
 Guillermo Sanguinetti (June 2012 – Nov 12)
 Mario Carballo (Nov 2012 – Dec 12)
 Julio César Ribas (Dec 2012–)

See also
Paysandú Bella Vista

References

External links

 

 
C.A. Bella Vista
Football clubs in Uruguay
Association football clubs established in 1920